Deo Sial (Dew Sial) is a town and Union Council of Chunian in the Punjab province of Pakistan. It is part of Chunian Tehsil and is located at an altitude of 171 metres (564 feet) above sea level. Deo Sial Union Council 74 elected local government of town. Rana Asif Shaheen is a respected personality of Deo Sial.

History 
Deo Sial is old village before 1947. Other than that Deo Sial is the 15rd biggest 
village of District Kasur by area after Harchoki and Jumber. The big village of Deo Sial is Hussain Khan Wala ch 8 that is organized and the best and model village of Kasur District.

Political Views:
Rana Muhammad Ishaq Khan MNA (PMLN)

Chairman: Sardar Yaseen Asim
Vice Chairman:  Rana Muhammad Fiaz

Councilor:
Ward 4: Ch Ubaid Ullah

Ward 1:  Nazir Muhamd Hussain

Ward 2: Ch Muhamamd ALi

Ward 3:M AKRAM

Ward5:  Sardar Majed Zaheer

Ward6: Seikh Abdur Jabar

Education 
Schools:
Government Elementary School For Boys
Government High School For Boys Hussain Khan wala Ch 8
Government High School For Girls Hussain Khan wala Ch 8
Aysha Model High School For Girls (PEF) Private Hussain Khan wala Ch 8
Asad Model High School (Private) Hussain Khan wala Ch 8
Government Primary School For Girls School
Shah-e-Najhaf Model Elementary School
Sharfa Modal School Kot Chudrya Wala
Ayaan Educational Complex
(BHU) Hospital Hussain Khan Wala Ch 8
Government Hospital Deosial

References

Kasur District